Idiostatus middlekauffi, known as Middlekauff's shieldback katydid, is a species of katydid endemic to the United States. It is considered "critically endangered" on the IUCN Red List.

References

Tettigoniinae
Insects of the United States
Taxonomy articles created by Polbot
Insects described in 1973
Taxobox binomials not recognized by IUCN